Kentucky Route 766 (KY 766) is a state maintained highway located near Ashland, Kentucky. It is the primary route through the unincorporated community of Ironville, which is a suburb of Ashland.

Route description
KY 766 begins at an intersection with KY 5 on the west side of Ironville. It heads east along Donta Road.  Near Roberts Road, Donta Road curves to the south and then back to the north where it intersects KY 1134.  KY 766 switches back onto Roberts Road and heads south.  Shortly thereafter, it turns east onto Bob McCullough Drive, while KY 3292 continues south on Roberts Road.  The street heads southeast for a short way before it ends at US 60.

Major intersections

References

External links

0766
0766